Aix-en-Provence TGV is a high-speed railway station located in Cabriès, Bouches-du-Rhône, southern France. The station was opened in 2001 and is located on the LGV Méditerranée. The train services are operated by SNCF. It serves the city of Aix-en-Provence, 15 km north-east of the station, Vitrolles, northern Marseille, 20 km south of the station and the Marseille Provence Airport.

Train services
From Aix-en-Provence TGV train services depart to major French cities such as: Paris, Lyon, Cannes, Nice, Dijon, Strasbourg, Montpellier, Nantes, Rennes and Lille.

International services operate to Belgium: Brussels, Antwerp (in summer); Germany: Frankfurt; Switzerland: Geneva; The Netherlands: Amsterdam, Rotterdam (in summer); and Spain: Barcelona.

High speed services (TGV) Paris - Lyon - Avignon - Aix-en-Provence - Marseille
High speed services (TGV) Paris - Aix-en-Provence - Cannes - Nice
High speed services (TGV Ouigo) Marne-la-Vallée - Lyon Saint-Exupéry - Aix-en-Provence - Marseille
High speed services (TGV) Lille - Aeroport CDG - Lyon - Aix-en-Provence - Marseille
High speed services (TGV) Brussels - Lille - Aeroport CDG - Lyon - Aix-en-Provence - Marseille
High speed services (TGV/ICE) Frankfurt - Strasbourg - Mulhouse - Belfort - Lyon - Avignon - Aix-en-Provence - Marseille
High speed services (TGV) Strasbourg - Lyon - Aix-en-Provence - Marseille
High speed services (TGV) Nantes - Angers - Tours - Lyon - Avignon - Aix-en-Provence - Marseille
High speed services (TGV) Rennes - Le Mans - Lyon - Avignon - Aix-en-Provence - Marseille
High speed services (TGV) Geneva - Lyon - Aix-en-Provence - Marseille
High speed services (Thalys) Amsterdam - Rotterdam - Antwerp - Brussels - Avignon - Aix-en-Provence - Marseille (Summer Saturdays)

Trains in the direction of Marseilles depart from platform 3; those for all other destinations from platform 4.

A summer Saturday only service from London, UK also terminated briefly at the station in 2013.

Bus services
The bus service L40 operates on the following routes:

Aix-en-Provence TGV - Aix-en-Provence at a 15 minute frequency
Aix-en-Provence TGV - Marseille Airport, half hourly

Other bus services operate to:

Digne-les-Bains, Saint-Maximin-la-Sainte-Baume and Le Luc.

References

External links

Gare d'Aix-en-Provence TGV
Railway stations in Bouches-du-Rhône
Railway stations in France opened in 2001